Huanghou Township is a township in Nanzhao County, Henan, China. , it administers Hongyang Residential Neighborhood and the following fourteen villages:
Huanghou Village
Tianqiao Village
Guozhuang Village
Hongqi Village
Niangniangmiao Village
Beizhaodian Village
Suwan Village
Liangshuiquan Village
Panping Village
Xinzhuang Village
Wang Village
Fenshuiling Village
Zhuzhuang Village
Kangzhuang Village

References 

Township-level divisions of Henan
Nanzhao County